Arthur De Greef (born 27 March 1992) is a former Belgian tennis player. De Greef has a career-high ATP singles ranking of No. 113, achieved on 19 June 2017 and has a career high ATP doubles ranking of No. 597 achieved on 4 March 2013. De Greef made his ATP main draw singles debut at the 2015 Grand Prix Hassan II where he qualified for the main draw and defeated the 8th seed Diego Schwartzman in the first round. In May 2021, De Greef was provisionally suspended for match-fixing by ITIA.

Challenger and Futures finals

Singles: 25 (12–13)

Doubles: 4 (3–1)

References

External links

 
 
 

1992 births
Living people
Belgian male tennis players
Sportspeople from Brussels
Sportspeople from Flemish Brabant